Jennifer Capriati Tennis (known as The Tennis Tournament: Grandslam in Europe) is a Sega Genesis video game developed by System Sacom and released in 1992. In 1994 it was released in the classic range by Sega as Grandslam (Classic). The game is named after Jennifer Capriati, one of the world's top-ranked female tennis players at the WTA Tour during the time of the game's release.

Gameplay
A gamer can create their own player by choosing their race, gender, and tennis wear color. In addition to this, the game can be played by either one or two players. There can be doubles and singles matches, in addition to numerous tournaments. Tournaments take place in various locations around the world, including Florida, London, Paris and Sydney.

References

1992 video games
Sega Genesis games
Sega Genesis-only games
Sports video games set in France
Sports video games set in the United States
Telenet Japan games
Tennis video games
Top-down video games
Video games set in London
Video games set in Florida
Video games set in Australia
Multiplayer and single-player video games
Video games developed in Japan
Video games based on real people
Capriati
Capriati